Françoise Buffet (born 11 December 1953) is a French politician of LREM who has been Member of Parliament for Bas-Rhin's 4th constituency in the National Assembly since 2022.

See also 

 List of deputies of the 16th National Assembly of France

References 

1953 births
Living people
Members of Parliament for Bas-Rhin
Women members of the National Assembly (France)
Deputies of the 16th National Assembly of the French Fifth Republic
21st-century French politicians
21st-century French women politicians
La République En Marche! politicians
People from Strasbourg